Donatille Mukabalisa (born July 30, 1960 in Nyamata) is a Rwandan lawyer and politician, notably the Speaker of the Chamber of Deputies. She was elected Speaker of the Rwandan parliament in 2013 after the country's national elections.

Biography 
Donatille Mukabalisa was born on July 30, 1960 in Nyamata. She teaches law at the Kigali Independent University.

She worked at the World Health Organization at the end of her studies and for 16 years at the United Nations Development Program.

Mukabalisa decided to become involved in politics in 2000, after the genocide and the transition period that followed the arrival of Paul Kagame as President of the Republic. She said that the years spent in a country where "human rights were seriously damaged" got her to make a decision to start her fight against injustice. She joined the Liberal Party of Rwanda which at the time was not the ruling party at the time but supported Paul Kagame's Rwandan Patriotic Front party. She was elected to the parliamentary of Rwanda after the elections of October 2003. She remained in that position from 2003 until 2008. From 2011 to 2013, she became a senator. She then returned as a Member of Parliament  after the 2013 legislative elections and as a candidate for the presidency of the Chamber of Deputies in spite of the few seats held by her party.

References 

Living people
1960 births
Speakers of the Chamber of Deputies (Rwanda)
Rwandan women lawyers
Rwandan lawyers
21st-century Rwandan women politicians
21st-century Rwandan politicians
People from Bugesera District
Women legislative speakers